Asuman Dabak (born 1 February 1970) is a Turkish actress.

Selected filmography

References

External links
 

1970 births
Living people
Turkish film actresses
Turkish television actresses
People from Akhisar